Top Stripper is a Slovenian rock band, created in Ljubljana, 2009. The group consists of Jaša Šaban (lead singer), Jure Demšar (lead guitar) and Rok Rožmanec (guitar, singer). Their first album Luck Don't Come Cheap was released in 2016. It also includes the most famous single Can't Hear You Cryin.

It began in high school when they started playing rock and blues hits from famous rock bands such as Guns N' Roses and AC/DC. Soon after that, they began writing their own music. As a support act, they have performed concerts to many famous bands such as Triggerfinger, H.I.M., Morcheeba, Letz Zep, Guns2Roses and some others.

First single "Can't Hear You Cryin'" was soon followed by their first album Luck Don't Come Cheap. Their motto is "The Soul of Blues and the Heart of Rock’n’Roll".

Members 
 Jaša Šaban – lead singer
 Jure Demšar – lead guitar
 Rok Rožmanec – guitar, singer

Discography

Luck Don't Come Cheap 
 Can't Hear You Cryin’
 The City of Angels
 Shoot the Boy
 Crazy Child
 Gone with the Train
 The Sound of the Devil
 Why Do I Need the Rain
 You Can All Go to Hell
 Do You Think It's Easy

References

External links 
 
 

Slovenian hard rock musical groups
Musical groups from Ljubljana
Musical groups established in 2009
2009 establishments in Slovenia